Robert Calvin Armstrong is the director of the Massachusetts Institute of Technology Energy Initiative and the Chevron Professor of Chemical Engineering. He has been a member of the MIT faculty since 1973, and served as head of the Department of Chemical Engineering from 1996 to 2007. He was elected a member of the National Academy of Engineering in 2008 for conducting outstanding research on non-Newtonian fluid mechanics, co-authoring landmark textbooks, and providing leadership in chemical engineering education. In 2020, he became a fellow of the American Academy of Arts and Sciences.

Armstrong finished a Bachelor of Chemical Engineering Degree at the Georgia Institute of Technology in 1970 and a Doctor of Philosophy in 1973 from the University of Wisconsin, Madison, also in Chemical Engineering.

References

Members of the United States National Academy of Engineering
Year of birth missing (living people)
Living people
MIT School of Engineering faculty
Georgia Tech alumni
Fellows of the American Academy of Arts and Sciences
University of Wisconsin–Madison College of Engineering alumni